Bill Currie was a Scottish amateur footballer who played as a centre half.

Career
Currie played non-league football for Rutherglen Glencairn and Dagenham. He also made 136 appearances in the Scottish Football League for Albion Rovers and Queen's Park.

Currie was also a member of the British national side which failed to qualify for the 1972 Summer Olympics.

References

1940s births
Living people
Scottish footballers
Rutherglen Glencairn F.C. players
Albion Rovers F.C. players
Queen's Park F.C. players
Dagenham F.C. players
Scottish Football League players
Scotland amateur international footballers
Association football central defenders